Inquisition is an action-adventure video game released in 2002 for Microsoft Windows. The game was developed by French company 4X Studios and published by Wanadoo Edition.

The 3rd person game, is set in 1348 Paris, France, where the main character, a young thief named Matthew, has come to find his riches. He becomes imprisoned after a robbery, and meets Jacques, a former Knight Templar. Before Jacques dies he reveals clues which lead the player towards finding the treasure of the Templars.

External links 
 Inquisition at Microïds

2002 video games
Action-adventure games
Microïds games
Single-player video games
Video games developed in France
Video games set in Paris
Video games set in the 14th century
Windows games
Windows-only games
Strategy First games